Philip John Chard (born 16 October 1960) is an English former footballer who made nearly 500 appearances in the Football League between 1978 and 1994, which included nearly 300 for Northampton Town, a club of which he was player-manager in the early 1990s.

References

External links

1960 births
Living people
People from Corby
English footballers
Association football midfielders
Peterborough United F.C. players
Northampton Town F.C. players
Wolverhampton Wanderers F.C. players
English football managers
Northampton Town F.C. managers
English Football League managers